Maryana Aleksandrovna Naumova (born April 22, 1999) is a Russian powerlifter who specializes in the bench press, and was the leading teenage girl in the world in the discipline. She has won many world championships, has set over 15 world records in her age category, and holds the title of Master of Sport of Russia, International Class. Her awarded victories are qualified by the fact that, despite being a minor, she was cheating through the use of diuretics and masking agents and presumably the doping substances that such agents masked, according to the Yearly Anti-Doping Report published by the International Powerlifting Federation in 2016.  Rather than showing contrition, Maryana's response was a suggestion to "recognize Russian blood as a dope".

Career

Maryana Naumova is the first female under-18 to be allowed to participate in professional powerlifting tournaments. In March 2015 she participated in the Arnold Classic, establishing the female record in the event Arnold BenchBach, lifting . After the tournament she asked Arnold Schwarzenegger to become the President of the United States and normalize Russia–United States relations. She also passed Arnold letters from Donbas children. She said that Arnold Schwarzenegger is a very important person in her life.

As part of Russia's support for the Assad government during the Syrian Civil War, Naumova travelled to Damascus at the invitation of Asma al-Assad, the president's wife.

At the 2016 Arnolds Sports Festival she participated in the SSP Nutrition Pro Raw Bench competition. She lifted  and placed third, but was later disqualified due to a positive doping test and suspended from lifting for two years.

Political views 
In commemoration of the late Russian revolutionary Vladimir Lenin, Naumova had joined the Communist Party of the Russian Federation to celebrate Lenin's 146th birthday and lay flowers at the Mausoleum on Red Square. Naumova was awarded the Order of the UCP-CPSU—also known as "Friendship of the People"—for her humanitarian aid work throughout the world. Professional MMA fighter Jeff Monson had also joined Naumova and the Communist Party to celebrate the life and legacy of Lenin.

In 2017, Naumova said:

In 2022, Naumova published a video reply to Arnold Schwarzenegger, inviting him to visit the Donbas region in order to witness the plight of the civilians under fire from Ukrainian forces. Naumova said that given that Arnold visited United States Army troops during the invasion of Iraq, he should be brave enough to visit children of Donbas that are being shelled by Ukrainian forces.

References

Inline citations

General references

External links 

Edgeofstars

1999 births
Living people
People from Staraya Russa
Russian communists
Russian powerlifters
Russian strength athletes
Sportspeople from Novgorod Oblast